George Sweeney may refer to:

George Clinton Sweeney (1895–1966), United States federal judge
George Sweeney (actor), British television and film actor
George Sweeney (politician), former politician in Newfoundland and Labrador, Canada
George Sweeney (educator) (born 1946), British educator
The George Sweeney Trial of 1806 in Richmond, Virginia, a murder trial